The Women's aerials competition at the FIS Freestyle Ski and Snowboarding World Championships 2019 was held on February 5 and 6, 2019.

Qualification
The qualification was started on February, 5 at 20:00. The twelve best skiers qualified for the final.

Final
The final was started on February 6, at 19:00.

References

Women's aerials